is a Japanese fencer. At the 2012 Summer Olympics he won a silver medal in the team foil event. In 2008, he was the Junior Men's Foil World Champion.

References

Japanese male foil fencers
Living people
People from Sendai
Sportspeople from Sendai
Olympic fencers of Japan
Fencers at the 2012 Summer Olympics
1989 births
Olympic silver medalists for Japan
Olympic medalists in fencing
Medalists at the 2012 Summer Olympics
Asian Games medalists in fencing
Fencers at the 2010 Asian Games
Asian Games silver medalists for Japan
Medalists at the 2010 Asian Games
21st-century Japanese people
20th-century Japanese people